The Perkin Prize for Organic Chemistry is a prestigious award established in 2008 by the Royal Society of Chemistry for sustained originality and achievement in research in any area of organic chemistry. 

The prize is named after Sir William Henry Perkin (1838-1907), inventor of the first aniline dye, and is awarded on a biennial basis. The winner receives £5000, a medal and a certificate at an awards ceremony in November and undertakes a UK lecture tour.

Winners

See also

 List of chemistry awards

References

Awards established in 2008
Awards of the Royal Society of Chemistry
2008 establishments in the United Kingdom